Norcot is an area of the suburb of Tilehurst in the town of Reading, in the English county of Berkshire. It is also an electoral ward of the Borough of Reading.

Location and origins
Norcot ward is the far eastern sector of the Reading borough portion of Tilehurst. As a commonly used suburban area, Norcot centres on Norcot Road and the upper Oxford Road on Norcot Hill. It is electorally partly in Norcot ward and partly in Kentwood to its west.  All these areas form a mixture of suburban and urban parts of West Reading. The original hamlet was near the junction of Norcot Road and Romany Lane and was largely made up of Norcot Farm in the north-east of old Tilehurst parish. The name means 'North Cottage' and has a southern neighbour Southcote, below Tilehurst church and manor.

Buildings and structures
The Norcot Water Tower, built at the end of the 19th century, is somewhat older than the more prominent Tilehurst Water Tower. It is 50ft high, a Grade II listed building and since 2002 has been converted into a luxury apartment. Norcot School was built in 1906. In its lifetime, it was both a senior and a junior school. It closed in 1989. Like much of Tilehurst, Norcot Hill was used for the extraction of clay for brickmaking. In the 1920s, S. E. Collier's transported the clay via overhead cables to their main site in the Dee Road area of Tilehurst. St George's Church, Reading was built on the north-eastern edge of Norcot in 1886, largely to service the soldiers of the nearby Brock Barracks. Norcot Mission Church was started in 1929 to serve the new Norcot council estate. It started in a hut on land rented from the Pulsometer Engineering Works. The church moved to a permanent building in Brockley Close in 1972. The post office is on the Oxford Road.

Electoral ward 
The ward of Norcot is west of the town centre and is bordered by Kentwood (the far western ward), Battle (the inner western ward), Southcote and Tilehurst wards.

As with all wards, apart from smaller Mapledurham, it elects three councillors to Reading Borough Council.  Elections since 2004 are held by thirds, with elections in three years out of four.

In the 2011, 2012 and 2014 a Labour Party candidate won each election. 

These Councillors are currently, in order of election: Graeme Hoskin, Jo Lovelock and Debs Absolom.

References

Suburbs of Reading, Berkshire
Tilehurst
Wards of Reading